Henry Tasman Lovell ( - ) was an Australian psychologist. He was born at East Kempsey, New South Wales, Australia.

References

Further reading
 </ref>
 Biography at Encyclopedia of Australian Science

1878 births
1958 deaths
Australian psychologists